Earl Mazo (July 7, 1919 – February 17, 2007) was an American journalist, author, and government official.

Education and early life
Born in Warsaw, Poland, Mazo migrated to the United States as a small child with his parents, Sonia and George Mazo. The Mazos settled in Charleston, South Carolina where they lived in the Hannah Enston Building. Mazo would later graduate from Clemson University. During World War II, he served as a public relations officer with the U.S. Army Air Force's 385th Bomb Group and was stationed in the United Kingdom.

Career
In the first week of May 1943, Mazo crossed the Atlantic Ocean at age 24 as a second lieutenant and a trained bombardier in the Army Air Corps (USAF). He survived a remarkable 32 missions over Europe in the rickety but reliable B-17s of the era, remarkable because the standard task was 25 missions. By the time Earl signed on for a second round, only 27 of the original 225 men in his wing remained alive. The records show a stunning number KIA—Killed in Action—while others were wounded or missing “somewhere in France” or in German prison camps. Earl stopped at 32 missions because the military offered him the opportunity to become a staff writer for Stars and Stripes, the newspaper published by the army in all theatres of action. Mazo had been a journalist in Greenville, South Carolina, when the war began before joining up in the spring of ’42. Having seen Europe from the skies in a B-17, Mazo was then deployed on the ground in France on D-Day plus 12 (12 days after D-Day) and accompanied Patton’s Third Army across France into Germany. 

Mazo reported for Stars and Stripes, the New York Herald Tribune, The New York Times, the Reader's Digest, and served for one year during the presidency of Harry Truman as a deputy assistant secretary of defense. In later life, Mazo was employed as head of the professional staff of the United States Congress Joint Committee on Printing.

In 1959, Mazo authored biography of Richard Nixon, Richard Nixon: A Political and Personal Portrait. The following year, he published a series of exposés on serious voter fraud in the United States which, he believed, cost Nixon the 1960 U.S. presidential election. His reports prompted a successful appeal by Nixon to Mazo's editors to terminate the series of stories on the grounds that the U.S. could not afford a constitutional crisis at the height of the Cold War. Nixon allegedly said to Mazo that "our country can't afford the agony of a constitutional crisis – and I damn well will not be a party to creating one, just to become president or anything else". Mazo would later express his disappointment at the decision, believing the series would have put him in contention for the Pulitzer Prize.

Personal life
Mazo was widowed from his first wife, but later remarried. He died at a hospital in Bethesda, Maryland from complications resulting from a fall at his home in Chevy Chase.

Bibliography
 Richard Nixon: A Political and Personal Portrait, New York: Harper (1959, 1960)

References

External links
 interview with Stephen Hess on his work with Mazo

American people of Polish-Jewish descent
1919 births
2007 deaths
The New York Times people
Clemson University alumni
New York Herald Tribune people
Writers from Warsaw
Writers from Charleston, South Carolina
Military personnel from Charleston, South Carolina
Polish emigrants to the United States
United States Army Air Forces personnel of World War II
Truman administration personnel
Jewish American journalists
Accidental deaths in Maryland
United States Army Air Forces officers
Accidental deaths from falls